The Ligurian Sea is an arm of the Mediterranean Sea. It lies between the Italian Riviera (Liguria) and the island of Corsica. The sea is thought to have been named after the ancient Ligures people.

Geography 
The sea borders Italy as far as its border with France, and the French island of Corsica. In the east, the sea borders the Tyrrhenian Sea, while in the west it borders the Mediterranean Sea proper. Genoa is the most prominent city in the area. The northwest coast is noted for its scenic beauty and favourable climate.

The Gulf of Genoa is its northernmost part. The sea receives the Arno River from the east and many other rivers that originate in the Apennines. The ports of Genoa, La Spezia, and Livorno are on its rocky coast.

According to a 1983 study, since 1977 a series of experimental analyses on sea-level variations at Genoa and Imperia highlighted "the existence of a seiche wave with a mean period of 5.8 hours", whose reasons weren't yet explained at that time. The Ligurian Sea was modeled as a rectangular semi-closed basin with a longitudinal length of 40 km and a transversal one of 10 km, in an average constant depth of 2000 m.

Extent 
The International Hydrographic Organization defines the limits of the Ligurian Sea as follows:
On the Southwest. A line joining Cape Corse (Cape Grosso, 9°23′E) the Northern point of Corsica to the frontier between France and Italy (7°31′E).

On the Southeast.
A line joining Cape Corse with Tinetto Island and thence through Tino and Palmaria Islands to San Pietro Point on the Coast of Italy.

On the North The Ligurian Coast of Italy.

Flowings 
The Ligurian Sea is attraversed by the Modified Atlantic Water (MAW) on its surface and by the Levantine Intermediate Water in depth. It is also brushed by the two main currents which surround the Corsica island: the Western Corsica Current and the Tyrrenian current that reaches the Corsica Channel.

Conservation 
In order to provide protection for the numerous cetacean (whales and dolphins; porpoises are not found in this part of the Mediterranean Sea) species in the Ligurian Sea the bordering countries established the sea as a SPAMI in 1999. The International Ligurian Sea Cetacean Sanctuary now covers  covering territorial waters as well as high sea.

Image gallery

References 

 
Marginal seas of the Mediterranean
European seas
Seas of Italy
Seas of France
Bodies of water of Monaco
Landforms of Corsica
Landforms of Liguria
Landforms of Tuscany
Geography of Western Europe
Geography of Southern Europe
Borders of Monaco
France–Italy border